Yengi Kand-e Seyyedlar (also Romanized as Yengī Kand-e Seyyedlar, Yengī Kand Seyyedlar, and Yangī Kand-e Seyyedlar; also known as Yangikand, Yangikend, and Yengī Kand) is a village in Golabar Rural District, in the Central District of Ijrud County, Zanjan Province, Iran. At the 2006 census, its population was 1,284, in 376 families.

References 

Populated places in Ijrud County